George Hickes may refer to:

 George Hickes (divine) (1642–1715), English divine and scholar
 George Hickes (Manitoba politician) (born 1946), Canadian politician
 George Hickes (Nunavut politician) (born 1968/69), Canadian politician, son of the above

See also 
 George Hicks (disambiguation)